Kamineni Institute of Dental Sciences, a private dental school near Hyderabad, Andhra Pradesh
 Kamineni Institute of Medical Sciences, a private medical college near Hyderabad, Andhra Pradesh.